Andreas van der Schaaf (The Hague, 27 October 1951) is a Dutch television presenter, producer and program developer. Internationally known for his work as the presenter of First Class Around the World (RTL5/CNBC) and as international Holland based reporter for CNN World Report.

Career 
1974-1975: NCRV-TV; Production & program development, Dutch game shows like; Spel zonder grenzen (International European game show), (Like Father, Like Son).
1977-1978: Actor in Dutch television series "" (Diary of a German Shepherd).
1976-1978: Copywriter at Ogilvy & Mather Advertising in Amsterdam and Free-Lance TV activities for.; Veronica & TROS TV.
1978-1980: Copywriter & Concepts at Young & Rubicam in Amsterdam and for Cato Johnson in Amsterdam.
1980–present:Andreas van der Schaaf TV & Video Productions and in 1995 start of Andreas van der Schaaf Creative Enterprises B.V.
1979-1980: Presenter of "Live" Quiz": "Teleraadsel" TROS and Creative Director at Young & Rubicam Advertising, Amsterdam.
1995-1997: Presenter "First Class Around the World" [RTL5 The Netherlands [NBC-Supertchannel], broadcast in over 60 countries
1998: Presenter of RTL4 TV series; "Vrouwen van het Gooi".
2002-2005: Presenter at BVN TV The Netherlands for 'Van Huis Uit' combined with items about Holland for CNN World Report.
2006–present:Member of the creative & editorial team of the TROS TV Show at Niehe Media/Media Lane in Amsterdam.
2016–present:Counselor for the City of Gooise Meren (for 50PLUS party)

External links

Website Andreas Schaaf

1951 births
Living people
Dutch television presenters
Mass media people from The Hague
Dutch television producers